The Journal for the Theory of Social Behaviour is a quarterly peer-reviewed interdisciplinary academic journal covering the study of social behaviour. It was founded in 1971 by Horace Romano Harré and Paul Secord to advance their alternative to the positivistic approach that was permeating much of social psychology at the time. It is published by Wiley-Blackwell and the editors-in-chief are Alex Gillespie (London School of Economics) and Douglas Porpora (Drexel University). According to the Journal Citation Reports, the journal has a 2017 impact factor of 1.341, ranking it 40th out of 64 journals in the category "Psychology, Social".

References

External links

Publications established in 1971
Social psychology journals
Multidisciplinary social science journals
Wiley-Blackwell academic journals
Quarterly journals
English-language journals